The 2007 Labatt Tankard Open Playdowns were held at the Crapaud Community Curling Club in Crapaud, Prince Edward Island from January 26–29. The top eight teams from the playdowns qualified for the final tournament.

Teams

Playdowns

A Event

B Event

C Event

External links
Playdowns Results

2007 in Canadian curling
Curling competitions in Prince Edward Island
2007 in Prince Edward Island